Tipi Tales is a Canadian children's television series about a First Nations family living in a woodlands cottage, and focused on teaching children about the importance of family and friends, as well as First Nations culture.

The show premiered on 5 February 2003, and ended in 2007. The series had three seasons, each consisting of twenty-six 10- to 14-minute episodes (a total of 78 episodes). The characters were represented by puppets.

The show was co-produced by APTN and Treehouse TV, and filmed by Eagle Vision in their dedicated studio in Winnipeg, Manitoba. Both networks aired the show simultaneously; the show was also broadcast in New Zealand and Australia. Reruns were cancelled from Treehouse TV on 6 September 2009, while APTN's reruns continued until 2010.

Characters
The series centers around four Ojibway cousins who learn various wisdoms of life during their visits to their great-grandfather’s home.

Russell
Russell (voiced by Herbie Barnes) is four years old. He is big for his age but is a very gentle and sensitive boy. People often expect more from him because of his size. He loves to eat and is always hoping that Great-Grandmother has something cooking in the kitchen, especially cookies or pies.

Russell has many fears. He tries hard to keep them to himself, but they usually surface in some type of disaster. He looks up to Junior and Elizabeth and wants to be "grown-up" just like them.

Russell counts on Sam to be his accomplice. Junior is his hero and Russell takes great pride in playing drums for Junior's dancing or even being asked to play with him. He is goofy and loud and his enthusiasm for life is contagious. But his greatest gift is the joy he brings to others.

Sam
Samantha "Sam" (voiced by Jan Skene) is a three-year-old who is a mischievous, funny, free spirit living in the moment. She thinks everything is "the bestest!" She's cute and snuggly with a curly bob of black hair flopping carelessly on top of her head. Sam can get away with just about anything. Her cousins find her a little annoying but would do anything for her.

Sam always pushes the limits and rarely listens to anyone. She thinks she doesn't need anyone's advice, but that usually gets her into her biggest scrapes.

In a way that only a three-year-old can, Sam always tells it like it is. She's smart, quick, and has sudden bolts of great big ideas. As a result, she can persuade her cousins to do wild and crazy things. She lives with joy and abandon.

Elizabeth
Elizabeth (voiced by Rebecca Gibson) is a precocious and confident five-year-old. She is artistic, expressive, and has an opinion on everything. She sees herself as the leader of the group. She can sometimes be self-absorbed and often ends up being excluded.

The "princess" of the group, Elizabeth wants things to go her way and is determined to see that happen. She has many fears but usually manages to hide them well. She fights for what she believes in (even when she is wrong) and periodically has meltdowns, but she has a good heart and loves her cousins very much.

While she can be nurturing, she often plays the martyr, complete with whole body sighs. "I have to do everything myself I guess...." Elizabeth knows she is destined for greatness. Even though she drives them crazy, her cousins all look up to her.

Junior
Junior (voiced by Ryan Rajendra Black) is a five-year-old Ojibway boy who stays at his great-grandparents' house in the every week while his parents work. His real name is Eugene, which he hates, so everyone calls him Junior. Junior is traditional and proud of it. He wears long braids and loves everything about being Native. He is very spiritual. Focused and serious, his feelings often get hurt. He and Elizabeth frequently clash over leadership issues. He can be very self-righteous, even a bulldozer at times, but he has great passion for life and nature.

Great-Grandfather is his hero and like him, Junior is a great dancer and loves telling traditional stories. He is sincere, loving, and hungry for life.

Great-Grandparents
The great-grandparents are wonderful caregivers. They love and support their great-grandchildren and are essential to their learning. They often open the door to new ways of thinking. They have gentle humour and great wisdom but never preach. They listen, understand and guide the children to the animal who will help them discover the best course of action.

Great-Grandmother
Great-Grandmother (voiced by Michelle St. John) is wise and kind, but often enigmatic. Great-Grandmother has a sense of humour and the kids make her laugh all the time.

Great-Grandmother makes the best saskatoonberry pies in the world. She makes quilts and gardens with equal passion.

Great-Grandfather
Great-Grandfather (voiced by Jules Desjarlais) is a fairly traditional man, but is willing to accept the modern world through the children. Great-Grandfather is a dreamer and storyteller but lives the seven principles.

Great-Grandfather listens well and understands. He doesn't judge. He has endless stories that enchant and inform the kids. He loves playing his drum and teaching the children to do a Native dance. His laugh is infectious and he never seems to get riled.

He is tender and humble and has a wonderful sense of humour. He has a respect for the natural world and teaches the kids about the voice in the wind, the spirit of the tree and giving a gift of thanks. He knows the stars, moon, and sun personally.

Animals
When the children have a problem, the great-grandparents instruct them to speak with an animal guide to help solve the problem. They would usually sing songs with the children. Each animal represents one of the Seven Sacred Laws, or teachings:

 Wolf is Humility
 Sabe (Bigfoot) is Honesty
 Bear is Courage
 Eagle is Love
 Buffalo is Respect
 Turtle is Truth
 Beaver is Wisdom

References

External links 
 

2000s Canadian children's television series
First Nations television series
Treehouse TV original programming
Aboriginal Peoples Television Network original programming
Canadian television shows featuring puppetry
Television series about children
Television series about bears
Television series about birds
Television series about turtles
Television series about wolves
Television shows filmed in Winnipeg
Canadian preschool education television series
Television shows set in Manitoba
Fictional characters from Manitoba